Phon Martdee (born 17 May 1958 in Saraburi, Thailand) is a Thai-born Australian Muay Thai instructor and promoter and a former Muay Thai boxer. Martdee is one of the best-known Muay Thai trainers in Australia, training over 30 champions of state, national, and international status and having been voted Muay Thai Trainer of the Year by the International Kickboxer Magazine in 1997 and was president of the Thai-Australian Association of Western Australia in 2007–2008. He is currently the trainer of World Boxing Council Muaythai Super Heavyweight National Champion Steve Bonner, Australian Champion Pamorn Martdee, WPMF Western Australian Champion Chris Garner, WBC Muay Thai Super Welterweight National Champion Jason Lea and top female prospect Melissa Norton.

Muay Thai career
Martdee was trained by his uncle Sargent Armporn Sarthong at a young age along with his brothers Somchai Martdee and Preechar Martdee, as a teenager he would fight in the outer provinces of Bangkok and would continue to fight throughout his studies at college. At 21 Martdee was chosen to represent Thailand in the Under 21s national soccer team where he would go on to be recognised as a skilled goalkeeper.

Instructor
Upon completing his bachelor's degree in Physical Education at Angthong University, Phon Martdee moved to Australia to open a martial arts centre known as "Muay Thai Boxing Promotions" or best known as "Phon's Gym" under the guidance of the Professional Boxing Association of Thailand (PAT) in 1989. At this time there were little known authentic Muay Thai gyms in Australia. Martdee began training groups of youths and adults interested in the newly founded ring sport. Martdee then began staging local events placing his fighters up against local BJC, boxing and kickboxing opponents. Over time Muay Thai gyms began opening around Perth allowing for an expanded selection of competition. In Martdee's 22 years of instructing he has trained over 30 champions at his gym which still operates in Northbridge to this day.

Promoter
Phon Martdee is a registered promoter with the Professional Combat Sports Commission of Western Australia. Since 1989 has promoted Muay Thai to the most authentic to Thailand level; regarded as the "Pioneer" of Muay Thai in Australia, Martdee was highly criticised for allowing boxers to perform the traditional "Wai Khru" prior to bouts in the early 1990s. To date Martdee has promoted over 60 events sanctioning multiple world titles, as well as countless National and State titles in the isolated city of Perth in Western Australia. Phon Martdee provided fighters to Queenslands premier Muay Thai promoter Blair Moore for the Conrad Jupiters Cup, also to top Victorian promoter Tarik Solak for the Crown Casino events in Melbourne and his own signator Promotions at Challenge Stadium and Burswood Resort Casino in Perth.

In 2005, Martdee was appointed the WBC Muay Thai representative promoter for Australia by WBC Muay Thai Chairman General Kovid Bhakdibhumi. Phon Martdee's current promotion series is Battle Collossal an ongoing series which features local fighters up against high-profile interstate/international fighters with WBC Sanctioned Titles. Martdee ordered that the Battle Colossal series support good causes for those in need; and in March 2010, Battle Colossal IX donated funds to the UNICEF Haiti Disaster Victims. Battle Colossal X on 21 August 2010 is set to donate funds to the Perth Strike A Chord for Cancer Foundation.

Honours
 1997 Inducted into the Blitz Hall of Fame (Muay Thai Instructor)
 2007–2008 President of the Thai-Australian Association of Western Australia
 2010 Profiled in the Muay Siam Magazine, Thailand

Notable boxers trained
 Daniel Dawson
 Pamorn Martdee
 Chris Garner
 Bruce Macfie

References

External links
About Phon Martdee

1958 births
Living people
Phon Martdee
Sportspeople from Perth, Western Australia
Boxing promoters
Australian Muay Thai practitioners
Muay Thai trainers
Thai emigrants to Australia